Aliabad (also Romanized as ‘Alīābād; also known as ‘Alīābād-e Pā’īn) is a village in Babolrud Rural District, in the Central District of Babolsar County, Mazandaran Province, Iran. At the 2006 census, its population was 1,542, in 412 families.

References 

Populated places in Babolsar County